Whittingham & Mitchel of Fulham United Kingdom were motor coach and body builders. A company named Whittingham and Mitchel Limited was formed in 1929 to buy that business. 

During the second World War it made light alloy components for the armed forces. Following the war Whittingham and Mitchell moved to Byfleet, Surrey and into alloy marine equipment. 10 years later they moved into structural reinforced plastics and built new premises in Chertsey. 

Whittingham and Mitchel Limited became a public listed company in July 1964. Six months later it was taken over and became part of the GEC group

Motor coach and body builders
Whittingham and Mitchel made bodies for motor coaches. During the 1930s Whittingham & Mitchel also manufactured short runs of special open bodies for mass-produced cars such as Vauxhall and specialist cars such as Alvis, MG and Wolseley.

Marine and structural engineers
Using special methods Whittingham and Mitchel rapidly made small ships up to 75 feet long such as fast coastal patrol boats. In 1964 a new coastal patrol boat was launched every 12 days and it took 36 days to manufacture a boat

Plastics
Thermoplastic mouldings were manufactured for use as specialised containers for: radio, radar equipment, frozen food transportation and prefabricated kitchens and bathrooms.

Takeover
Very shortly after the business was listed on the Stock Exchange in 1964 it was bought by a subsidiary of Arnold Weinstock's rapidly expanding GEC.

References

Whittingham
Vehicle manufacture in London